Pegasus Hockey Club is a women's field hockey club based in Belfast, Northern Ireland. The club enter teams in the Women's Irish Hockey League, the Irish Senior Cup, the Irish Junior Cup and the Ulster Shield. Pegasus has also represented Ireland in European competitions. Pegasus was founded in 1961 by students and teachers from the Ulster College of Physical Education, Jordanstown and Stranmillis University College. The Pegasus name is an acronym of Physical Education Girls and Staff Ulster College and Stranmillis.

History

Ulster Shield
Pegasus won the Ulster Shield for the first time in 1966–67. In 1967–68 they won their first Ulster double, winning both the Shield and the Senior League.

Notes

Irish Senior Cup
Pegasus won the Irish Senior Cup for the first time in 1973–74. The club completed a treble, also winning the Ulster Shield and the Senior League.

Notes

All-Ireland Club Championship
Pegasus won the inaugural All-Ireland Club Championship in 1990–91. Between 1999 and 2003 Pegasus won the championship five times in a row.

Women's Irish Hockey League
After winning their first title in 2010–11, Pegasus added a second in 2014–15. Ayeisha McFerran was a member of their 2014–15 title winning team.

Notes

Pegasus in Europe

Irish Junior Cup

Notable players
 internationals
In 1966–67 Sandra Wylie became the first Pegasus player to represent the Ireland women's national field hockey team. When Ireland won the silver medal at the 2018 Women's Hockey World Cup, the squad included two current or former Pegasus players,  Ayeisha McFerran and Shirley McCay.

 internationals
 Jenny Givan
 Maggie Gleghorne 
 Violet McBride

Coaches
 Billy McConnell; 2007–2010

Honours
EuroHockey Club Champions Trophy
Winners: 2012: 1
European Cup Winners Cup B Division
Winners: 1992–93: 1
European Club Championships B Division
Winners: 1998–99: 1
Runners Up: 2001–02: 1
Irish Senior Cup
Winners: 1974, 1978, 1981, 1984, 1987, 1989, 1992, 1995, 1996, 1998, 2004, 2007, 2008, 2010–11 : 14 
Runners Up: 1968, 1969, 1975, 1976, 1985, 1994, 1999, 2001, 2009, 2017–18: 10
Ulster Shield
Winners: 1966–67, 1967–68, 1968–69, 1972–73, 1973–74, 1974–75, 1975–76, 1977–78, 1978–79, 1980–81, 1981–82, 1983–84, 1986–87, 1987–88, 1988–89, 1995–96, 1996–97, 1997–98, 1998–99, 1999–2000, 2000–01, 2001–02, 2002–03, 2004–05, 2005–06, 2007–08, 2008–09, 2011–12, 2018–19 : 29 
Runners Up: 1971–72, 1976–77, 1984–85, 1993–94, 2012–13, 2013–14, 2014–15 : 7
Women's Irish Hockey League
Winners: 2010–11, 2014–15, 2018–19: 3 
Runners Up: 2015–16: 1
All-Ireland Club Championship
Winners: 1991, 1998, 1999, 2000, 2001, 2002, 2003, 2005, 2007: 8 ?
Runners Up: 2006: 1
EY Champions Trophy
Winners: 2018–19
Runners Up: 2016
Irish Junior Cup
Winners: 1969, 1973, 1974, 1993, 1995, 1996, 1997, 1998, 2000, 2003, 2004: 11 
Runners Up: 1962, 2002: 2

References

Field hockey clubs in Northern Ireland
Sports clubs in Belfast
1961 establishments in Northern Ireland
Field hockey clubs established in 1961
Women's Irish Hockey League teams